NRP Rio Minho is a patrol vessel designed by the Portuguese Navy to conduct patrol missions in shallow waters. Only one ship of the class was built, the NRP Rio Minho (P370), which is used to patrol the Minho River.

See also

 Centauro-class patrol boat

Argos-class patrol boat
Arsenal do Alfeite

References 

Patrol boat classes
Patrol vessels of the Portuguese Navy
1990s ships
Ships built in Portugal

Military equipment of Portugal